Dancemania 7 is the seventh set in the Dancemania series of dance music compilation albums, released in 1997 by EMI Music Japan.

The album debuted at #10 on Oricon's weekly album chart in October 1997 and remained within the top 20 positions on the chart for 3 consecutive weeks, peaking at #8.

The non-stop mixing was done by Captain Jack.


Tracks

Further details

The album's overall average tempo is 133 bpm;
The slowest track is "That's The Way '97" (#4) at 116 bpm.
The fastest track is "I Believe" (#23) at 160 bpm.
Several tracks are cover versions or remix versions.
#2 "The Winner Takes It All" is a cover version of ABBA's "The Winner Takes It All".
#4 "That's The Way '97" is a remix version of Redhead Kingpin and the F.B.I.'s "Do the Right Thing".
#22 "Moonlight Shadow" is a dance cover version of Mike Oldfield's "Moonlight Shadow".
Several tracks on the album, including different remixes, can also be found on other Dancemania albums such as Classics, Club Classics, Club The Earth, Club The Earth Disco Classics, Summers, Extra, Diamond, Diamond Complete Edition, Best Yellow, Best Red, Zip Mania, Zip Mania Best, Scorccio Super Hit Mix, Disco Groove, Delux 2, Delux 5, Speed 1, Covers 1 or X8.

References

7
1997 compilation albums
Dance music compilation albums